The Loening C-4C, later the Keystone-Loening K-85 Air Yacht following the merger of the Loening and Keystone companies, was an amphibious utility biplane built in the United States in the late 1920s. It was developed by Grover Loening from the C-1 that he had created together with Leroy Grumman, incorporating a new fuselage design. This departed from the characteristic Loening design feature of having a slender, "shoehorn" float projecting from the underside of the fuselage with an engine mounted tractor-fashion above it. Instead, the C-4C had a conventional flying-boat hull, with an enclosed cabin for passengers. The engine was mounted in a separate nacelle on the leading edge of the upper wing.

Two C-4Cs were built in 1928, shortly before the corporate merger. In 1931, Keystone-Loening built two examples of a revised version, but no further production ensued.

Thompson Aeronautical Corporation (TAC), a U.S.-based air carrier, was operating scheduled passenger service between Detroit and Cleveland in 1930 with Keystone–Loening Air Yacht aircraft with six round trip flights a day between the two cities.

Specifications (K-85 Air Yacht)

References

 
 aerofiles.com

1920s United States civil utility aircraft
Flying boats
Air Yacht
Air Yacht
Single-engined tractor aircraft
Biplanes
Amphibious aircraft
Aircraft first flown in 1928